The Roman Catholic Diocese of Bellary is a diocese located in the city of Bellary in the Ecclesiastical province of Bangalore in India.

History
 15 June 1928: Established as Mission “sui iuris” of Bellary from the Diocese of Hyderabad and Metropolitan Archdiocese of Madras
 10 March 1949: Promoted as Diocese of Bellary

Leadership
 Bishops of Bellary (Latin Rite)
 Bishop Henry D’Souza (15 March 2008 – present)
 Archbishop Bernard Blasius Moras (Apostolic Administrator 18 November 2006 – 15 March 2008)
 Bishop Joseph D’Silva (6 October 1992 – 17 November 2006)
 Bishop Ambrose Papaiah Yeddanapalli, O.F.M. (10 December 1963 – 1992)
 Bishop John Forest Hogan, O.F.M. (10 March 1949 – 23 September 1962)
 Ecclesiastical Superiors of Bellary (Latin Rite) 
 Fr. John Forest Hogan, O.F.M. (later Bishop) (1934 – 10 March 1949)
 Fr. Ernesto Reilly, O.F.M. (1928 – 1934)

Saints and causes for canonisation
 Servant of God Msgr. Francis Xavier Kroot, MHM

References

 GCatholic.org
 Catholic Hierarchy
 Diocese website

Roman Catholic dioceses in India
Christian organizations established in 1928
Roman Catholic dioceses and prelatures established in the 20th century
1928 establishments in India
Christianity in Karnataka
Bellary